Snegulka Detoni (de Toni) (22 May 1921 – 14 January 2016) was a prominent Slovene physicist and chemist known for her research in hydrogen bonding. She was the recipient of the Boris Kidrič Prize in 1961.

Detoni was the first female researcher in the University of Ljubljana's physics department.

Awards and honours
Detoni was awarded the Boris Kidrič Prize in 1961 along with Robert Blinc for her work in hydrogen bonding research.

References 

1921 births
2016 deaths
Yugoslav physicists
Yugoslav women scientists
People from Inner Carniola